Nyctocyrmata numeesia is a species of moth belonging to the family Tineidae that is known from Namibia.

References

Myrmecozelinae
Moths of Africa
Lepidoptera of Namibia
Moths described in 2011